Li Ang (born 15 September 1993) is a Chinese footballer who currently plays for Shanghai Port in the Chinese Super League.

Club career
Li Ang started his football career with Jiangsu Suning in 2014 after playing for Jiangsu Youth during the 2011 season and the 2012 season. He made his debut for the club in a league game on 8 March 2014 in a 0-0 draw against Guizhou Renhe. He scored his first goal for the club in a league game on 11 May 2014 in a 1-0 win against Changchun Yatai. Throughout the season he would go on to establish himself as an integral member of the team and would play in the 2014 Chinese FA Cup, which the club lost 5-4 on aggregate to Shandong Luneng Taishan. The following season Li would continue to cement his position within the team and go to win the 2015 Chinese FA Cup against Shanghai Shenhua.

International career
Li made his debut for the Chinese national team on 22 June 2014 in a 0-0 draw against Macedonia.

Career statistics

Club statistics
.

International statistics

Honours

Club
Jiangsu Suning
Chinese FA Cup: 2015
Chinese Super League: 2020

Individual
Chinese Super League Team of the Year: 2019

References

External links
 
 

1993 births
Living people
Chinese footballers
Footballers from Jiangsu
Jiangsu F.C. players
Shanghai Port F.C. players
China international footballers
2015 AFC Asian Cup players
Chinese Super League players
China League Two players
Footballers at the 2014 Asian Games
Association football defenders
Asian Games competitors for China